Stonewall Jackson (March 4, 1891 – October 13, 1943) was an American major general during World War II. He died while on active duty commanding the 84th Infantry Division near Camp Howie, Texas.

Although it is believed that he was named after Confederate Lieutenant General Thomas Jonathan "Stonewall" Jackson, it is not believed he is related to him. However, his father was a cavalry officer who served under Thomas "Stonewall" Jackson. 

Jackson had served in the Army of Occupation after the First World War. He later was served as professor of military science and tactics at Georgetown University. He also taught at Cornell. Jackson had been made a division commander in February 1943, and he was promoted to major general on March 15, 1943.

Jackson died on October 13, 1943, at the Camp Polk Station Hospital as a result of injuries received in a plane crash from October 4, 1943. He was one of the highest-ranking American generals to die in the United States during World War II along with General Malin Craig, Major General Herbert Dargue, Major General Frank C. Mahin, Major General Robert Olds, Major General Paul Newgarden, and Major General William H. Rupertus.

References

External links
Arlington National Cemetery
Generals of World War II

1891 births
1943 deaths
Georgetown University faculty
Cornell University faculty
Burials at Arlington National Cemetery
United States Army generals of World War II
United States Army generals
United States Army personnel killed in World War II
Victims of aviation accidents or incidents in the United States
Victims of aviation accidents or incidents in 1943
United States Army personnel of World War I
Military personnel from Kentucky